Keondre Coburn (born May 23, 2000) is an American football defensive tackle for the Texas Longhorns.

High school career
Coburn attended Westfield High School in Houston, Texas. As a senior, he had 56 tackles and 7.5 sacks. He played in the 2018 Under Armour All-America Game. Coburn committed to the University of Texas at Austin to play college football.

College career
Coburn played in three games his first year at Texas in 2018 and took a redshirt. As a redshirt freshman in 2019, he started 12 of 13 games, recording 26 tackles and two sacks. As a sophomore he played in and started all 10 games and had 25 tackles and one sack. Coburn started 11 of 12 games in 2021, finishing with 15 tackles and a sack. He returned to Texas for his senior year in 2022.

College statistics

References

External links
Texas Longhorns bio

Living people
Players of American football from Texas
American football defensive tackles
Texas Longhorns football players
Year of birth missing (living people)